Navajo weaving are textiles produced by Navajo people, who are based near the Four Corners area of the United States. Navajo textiles are highly regarded and have been sought after as trade items for more than 150 years. Commercial production of handwoven blankets and rugs has been an important element of the Navajo economy. As one art historian wrote, "Classic Navajo serapes at their finest equal the delicacy and sophistication of any pre-mechanical loom-woven textile in the world."

Navajo textiles were originally utilitarian weavings, including cloaks, dresses, saddle blankets, and similar items. By the mid-19th century, Navajo wearing blankets were trade items prized by Indigenous peoples of the Great Plains and neighboring tribes. Toward the end of the 19th century, Navajo weavers began to make rugs for non-Native tourists and for export. 

Earlier Navajo textiles have strong geometric patterns. They are a flat tapestry-woven textile produced in a fashion similar to kilims of Eastern Europe and Western Asia, but with some notable differences. In Navajo weaving, the slit weave technique common in kilims is not used, and the warp is one continuous length of yarn, not extending beyond the weaving as fringe. Traders from the late 19th and early 20th century encouraged adoption of some kilim motifs into Navajo designs. Textiles with representational imagery are called pictorial. Today, Navajo weavers work in a wide range of styles from geometric abstraction and representationalism to biomorphic abstraction and use a range of natural undyed sheep wool, natural dyes, and commercial dyes.

Purpose
Originally, Navajo blankets were used in a wide variety of garments, including (but not limited to) dresses, saddle blankets, serapes, night covers, or as a “door” at the entrance of their homes.

History

Pueblo influence
The Navajo may have learned to weave from their Pueblo Indian neighbors when they moved into the Four Corners region possibly around AD 1000 to 1200. Some experts contend that the Navajo were not weavers until after the 17th century. The Navajo obtained cotton through local trade routes before the arrival of the Spanish, after which time they began to use wool. The Pueblo and Navajo were not generally on friendly terms due to frequent Navajo raids on Pueblo settlements, yet many Pueblo sought refuge with their Navajo neighbors in the late 17th century to evade the conquistadors in the aftermath of the Pueblo Revolt. This social interchange is the probable origin of the distinctive Navajo weaving tradition. Spanish records show that Navajo people began to herd sheep and weave wool blankets from that time onward.

The extent of Pueblo influence on Navajo weaving is uncertain. As Wolfgang Haberland notes, "Prehistoric Puebloan textiles were much more elaborate than historic ones, as can be seen in the few remnants recovered archaeologically and in costumed figures in pre-contact kiva murals." Haberland suggests that the absence of surviving colonial-era Pueblo textile examples make it impossible to do more than conjecture about whether the creative origins of Navajo weaving arose from Navajo culture or were borrowed from the neighboring people.

Early records

Written records establish the Navajo as fine weavers for at least the last 300 years, beginning with Spanish colonial descriptions of the early 18th century. By 1812, Pedro Piño called the Navajo the best weavers in the province. Few remnants of 18th-century Navajo weaving survive; the most important surviving examples of early Navajo weaving come from Massacre Cave at Canyon de Chelly, Arizona. In 1804, a group of Navajo were shot and killed there, where they were seeking refuge from Spanish soldiers. For a hundred years the cave remained untouched due to Navajo taboos until local trader Sam Day entered it and retrieved the textiles. Day separated the collection and sold it to various museums. The majority of Massacre Cave blankets feature plain stripes, but some exhibit the terraces and diamonds characteristic of later Navajo weaving.

Wider commerce

Commerce expanded after the Santa Fe Trail opened in 1822, and greater numbers of examples survive. Until 1880, all such textiles were blankets as opposed to rugs. In 1850, these highly prized trade items sold for $50 in gold, a huge sum at that time.

Railroad service reached Navajo lands in the early 1880s and resulted in considerable expansion of the market for Navajo woven goods. According to Kathy M'Closkey of the University of Windsor in Ontario, Canada, "wool production more than doubled between 1890 and 1910, yet textile production escalated more than 800%". Purchases of manufactured yarn compensated for the deficit in wool production. Federal government reports affirmed that this weaving, which was performed almost exclusively by women, was the most profitable Navajo industry during that era. Quality declined in some regards as the weavers attempted to keep up with demand. However, today the average price of a rug is about $8,000.

Several European-American merchants influenced Navajo weaving during the next decades. The first to advertise Navajo textiles in a catalog was C. N. Cotton in 1894. Cotton encouraged professional production and marketing among his peers and the weavers whose work they handled. Another trader named John B. Moore, who settled in the Chuska Mountains in 1897 attempted to improve the quality of textiles he traded. He attempted to regulate the cleaning and dyeing process of artisans who did business with him, and shipped wool intended for higher grade weaving outside the region for factory cleaning. He limited the range of dyes in textiles he traded and refused to deal fabric that had included certain commercially produced yarns.  Moore's catalogs identified individual textile pieces rather than illustrating representative styles. He appears to have been instrumental in introducing new motifs to Navajo weaving. Carpets from the Caucasus region were popular among Anglo-Americans at that time. Both the Navajo and the Caucasus weavers worked under similar conditions and in similar styles, so it was relatively simple for them to incorporate Caucasus patterns such as an octagonal motif known as a gul.

Traders encouraged the locals to weave blankets and rugs into distinct styles. They included "Two Gray Hills" (credited to George Bloomfield, Ed Davies, and local Navajo weavers, are predominantly black and white, with traditional patterns), "Teec Nos Pos" (colorful, with very extensive patterns), "Ganado" (founded by John Lorenzo Hubbell), red dominated patterns with black and white, "Crystal" (founded by J. B. Moore), Oriental and Persian styles (almost always with natural dyes), "Wide Ruins," "Chinle," banded geometric patterns, "Klagetoh", diamond type patterns, "Red Mesa" and bold diamond patterns. Many of these patterns exhibit a fourfold symmetry, which is thought by Professor Gary Witherspoon to embody traditional ideas about harmony or Hozh.

Recent developments
Large numbers of Navajo continue to weave commercially. Contemporary weavers are more likely to learn the craft from a Dine College course, as opposed to family.  Contemporary Navajo textiles have suffered commercially from two sets of pressures: extensive investment in pre-1950 examples and price competition from foreign imitations. Modern Navajo rugs command high prices.

Construction

Wool and yarn

In the late 17th century, the Navajo acquired the Iberian Churra, a breed of sheep, from Spanish explorers. These animals were developed into a unique breed by the Navajo, today called the Navajo-Churro. These sheep were well-suited to the climate in Navajo lands, and that produced a useful long-staple wool. Hand-spun wool from these animals was the main source of yarn for Navajo blankets until the 1860s, when the United States government forced the Navajo people to relocate at Bosque Redondo and seized their livestock. Before their removal, the early weaving practice was such that unprocessed wool was chiefly used to make blankets and which still retained its lanolin and suint (sweat), and which could repel water, on the one hand, but which left an unpleasant odor to the finished woolen product, on the other. The 1869 peace treaty that allowed the Navajo to return to their traditional lands included a $30,000 settlement to replace their livestock. The tribe purchased 14,000 sheep and 1,000 goats. Between 1870–1900, commercially processed, pre-dyed woolen goods were introduced to the Navajo, which they incorporated in their weaving.  

Mid-19th century Navajo rugs often used a three-ply yarn called Saxony, which refers to high-quality, naturally dyed, silky yarns. Red tones in Navajo rugs of this period come either from Saxony or from a raveled cloth known in Spanish as bayeta, which was a woolen manufactured in England. With the arrival of the railroad in the early 1880s, another machine-produced yarn came into use in Navajo weaving: four-ply aniline dyed yarn known as Germantown because the yarn was manufactured in Pennsylvania.

Among the locally produced yarns for Navajo textile, indiscriminate breeding from 1870-1890 caused a steady decline in wool quality. Increasing proportions of brittle kemp can be found in well-preserved examples from the period. In 1903, federal agents attempted to address the problem by introducing Rambouillet rams into the breeding population. The Rambouillet is a French breed that produces good meat and heavy, fine-wool fleeces. The Rambouillet stock were well adapted to the Southwestern climate, but their wool was less suitable to hand spinning. Short-stapled Rambouillet wool has a tight crimp, which makes hand spinning difficult. The higher lanolin content of its wool necessitated significantly more scouring with scarce water before it could be dyed effectively. From 1920 to 1940, when Rambouillet bloodlines dominated the tribe's stock, Navajo rugs have a characteristically curly wool and sometimes a knotted or lumpy appearance.

In 1935, the United States Department of the Interior created the Southwestern Range and Sheep Breeding Laboratory to address the problems Rambouillet stock had caused for the Navajo economy. Located at Fort Wingate, New Mexico, the program's aim was to develop a new sheep bloodline that simulated the wool characteristics of the 19th-century Navajo-Churro stock and would also supply adequate meat. The Fort Wingate researchers collected old Navajo-Churro stock from remote parts of the reservation and hired a weaver to test their experimental wool. Offspring of these experiments were distributed among the Navajo people. World War II interrupted the greater part of this effort when military work resumed at Fort Wingate.

Coloration

Prior to the mid-19th century, Navajo weaving coloration was mostly natural brown, white, and indigo. Indigo dye was obtained through trade and purchased in lumps.

By the middle of the century, the palette had expanded to include red, black, green, yellow, and gray which signifies different aspects of the earth as defined by different locations of the reservation. Navajo used indigo to obtain shades from pale blue to near black and mixed it with indigenous yellow dyes such as the rabbit brush plant to obtain bright green effects. Red was the most difficult dye to obtain locally. Early Navajo textiles use cochineal, an extract from a Mesoamerican beetle, which often made a circuitous trade route through Spain and England on its way to the Navajo. Reds used in Navajo weaving tended to be raveled from imported textiles. The Navajo obtained black dye through piñon pitch and ashes.

After railroad service began in the early 1880s, aniline dyes became available in bright shades of red, orange, green, purple, and yellow. Gaudy "eyedazzler" weaves dominated the final years of the 19th century. Navajo weaving aesthetics underwent rapid change as artisans experimented with the new palette and a new clientele entered the region whose tastes differed from earlier purchasers. During the later years of the 19th century, the Navajo continued to produce earlier styles for traditional customers while they adopted new techniques for a second market.

Weaving

Traditional Navajo weaving used upright looms with no moving parts. Support poles were traditionally constructed of wood; steel pipe is more common today. The artisan sits on the floor during weaving and wraps the finished portion of fabric underneath the loom as it grows. The average weaver takes anywhere from two months to many years to finish a single rug. The size greatly determines the amount of time spent weaving a rug. The ratio of weft to warp threads had a fine count before the Bosque Redondo internment and declined in the following decades, then rose somewhat to a midrange ratio of five to one for the period 1920-1940. 19th-century warps were colored handspun wool or cotton string, then switched to white handspun wool in the early decades of the 20th century.

Position in Navajo religion
Weaving plays a role in the creation myth of Navajo cosmology, which articulates social relationships and continues to play a role in Navajo culture. According to one aspect of this tradition, a spiritual being called "Spider Woman" instructed the women of the Navajo how to build the first loom from exotic materials including sky, earth, sunrays, rock crystal, and sheet lightning. Then "Spider Woman" taught the Navajo how to weave on it.
Because of this belief traditionally there will be a “mistake“ somewhere within the pattern.  It is said to prevent the weaver from becoming lost in spider woman’s web or pattern.

Use of traditional motifs sometimes leads to the mistaken notion that these textiles serve a purpose in Navajo religion. Actually these items have no use as prayer rugs or any other ceremonial function, and controversy has existed among the Navajo about the appropriateness of including religious symbolism in items designed for commercial sale. The financial success of purported ceremonial rugs led to their continued production.

Weaving styles and designs 
 1st, 2nd, and 3rd phase Chief Blanket
 Ganado
 Two Grey Hills
 Red Mesa Outline or Eye Dazzler
 Teec Nos Pos
 Klagetoh
 Chinle
 Crystal
 Burntwater
 Wide Ruins 
 Storm Pattern 
 Newlands Raised Outline 
 Coal Mine Mesa Raised Outline 
 Yei 
 Yei be Chei 
 Pine Springs 
 Germantown (old and contemporary)
 Sand Paining or Mother Earth Father Sky 
 Spider rock design 
 Pictorial Rugs 
 Burnham Design 
 Eye Dazzler 
 JB Moore plate rugs 
 Double and Single saddle blankets 
 Diamond Twill 
 Two Faced 
 Blue Canyon

Many of these patterns are handed down from one weaver to the next generation of weavers who live within the same area.  Because of this tradition older rugs can be traced back to a geographic location where it was produced.

Critical study

Until recently, anthropologists have dominated the study of Navajo textiles. Most historic examples of these works belong to ethnological collections rather than fine art collections, which means items have been exhibited and analyzed with an eye toward normative or average works rather than emphasizing technical or artistic excellence. These priorities have artificially inflated the market value for items of inferior craftsmanship. In general, this tendency has affected most non-European art to some degree.

See also
Barbara Teller Ornelas
Clara Sherman
Daisy Taugelchee
Hosteen Klah
Navajo trading posts
Tapestry
Weaving (mythology)

Notes

References
 Nancy J. Blomberg, Navajo Textiles: The William Randolph Hearst Collection, Tucson: University of Arizona Press, 1988.
 Lois Essary Jacka, Beyond Tradition: Contemporary Indian Art and Its Evolution, Flagstaff, Arizona: Northland, 1991.
 Wolfgang Haberland, "Aesthetics in Native American Art" in The Arts of the North American Indian: Native Traditions in Evolution, ed. Paul Anbinder, New York: Philbrook Art Center, 1986.
 J.C.H. King, "Tradition in Native American Art" in The Arts of the North American Indian: Native Traditions in Evolution, ed. Paul Anbinder, New York: Philbrook Art Center, 1986.
 Evan M. Maurer, "Determining Quality in Native American Art" in The Arts of the North American Indian: Native Traditions in Evolution, ed. Paul Anbinder, New York: Philbrook Art Center, 1986.
 Marian E. Rodee, Old Navajo Rugs: Their Development from 1900 to 1940, Albuquerque: University of New Mexico Press, 1983.
 Stefani Salkeld, Southwest Weaving: A Continuum, San Diego: San Diego Museum of Man, 1996.

External links and further reading

Weaving in Beauty - how to identify types of Navajo textiles, weaving classes, articles
 Navajo Nation Arts & Crafts Enterprise
History of the Navajo Rug, by Navajo Rug Repair Co.
TOWARDS AN UNDERSTANDING OF NAVAJO AESTHETICS Kathy M’Closkey
Navajo Weaving at the Arizona State Museum: 19th Century Blankets, 20th Century Rugs, 21st Century Views - a good illustrated history, with comments from Navajo weavers and museum curators
Navajo chief's blankets: three phases, by Douglas Deihl, appraiser
SAR- Navajo Weaver Marlowe Katoney - Contemporary Navajo weaver Marlowe Katoney talks about his art.
Interview with Navajo Weaver Melissa Cody - Contemporary Navajo weaver Melissa Cody discusses her art and current projects.

Weaving
Tapestries
Indigenous textile art of the Americas